John Edward Tiña Tajanlangit (born July 14, 1977), professionally known as Jed Madela, is a Filipino singer, songwriter, TV host, entertainer, and occasional actor. He was the first Filipino to win the World Championships of Performing Arts title.

Biography
Jed Madela was born in Iloilo City, Iloilo, Philippines, the son of JC Roy Madela Tajanlangit, a church choirmaster, and Agnes Taleon Tiña, an Administrative Assistant at Pepsi. He is the elder brother of Eric Tajanlangit and Joanne Christine Tajanlangit.

Personal life
Madela was baptized as a Roman Catholic. He is currently single and has no children.

Education
He graduated with a Bachelor of Science degree in Business Administration at University of San Agustin in Iloilo City.

Career
In 2003, 16 Asian countries participated in the Voice of Asia consisting of 18 contestants. He became the first official male representative from the Philippines to participate in that aforementioned contest. He ranked 1st place consistently for 3 days in the internet poll survey, and was given the "People's Choice Award" on the finals night for being the Grand Champion in the internet polls. He also won the Silver Trophy, judged by a panel of jury in the actual competition. He received a plaque for being the "Sponsor's Choice" in the competition. Five months later, Mainhill Awards of Kazakhstan awarded him as the "Best Voice of Asia Male Singer of the Year 2003". He shared the limelight with George Benson and Billy Joel who both received the Lifetime Achievement Awards in the same award-giving body. Madela's powerful voice was showcased at the competition, as he sang these three winning pieces: "I'll Be Around"; "Labis Akong Umibig" (I Loved Too Much); and his showstopping festival arrangement of  Martin Nievera's classic hit "Be My Lady" wherein he held the final high note for 17 seconds, eliciting a standing ovation. All songs were composed by Mr. Vehnee Saturno who was with him during the competition in Kazakhstan.

Often referred to as "The Voice" and "The Singer's Singer" by the media, Jed Madela is one of the best male singers the country has ever produced. Jed made waves during the 2005 World Championship of the Performing Arts (WCOPA) in Hollywood California when he single-handedly won all major industry awards, 6 gold medals for all 6 categories he joined, the Champion Vocalist World Star Trophy, and the most coveted and ultimate title "Grand Champion Performer of the World", the first Filipino to win the title. He bested over 3,000 contestants from 52 countries to win the grand prize.
There were six categories whereby Jed won gold. For the pop category, he sang "I'm Your Angel". For the original song category, meaning a composition from the singer's home country, he did Martin Nievera's old hit, "Be My Lady". For Broadway ("Home"), pop duet (with Rizza Navales, they sang ("Last Night of the World"), gospel ("Take Me Out of the Dark"), and for the final song that made him as the grand champion, he sang Aerosmith's "I Don't Wanna Miss A Thing". He also brought home two Champion of the World plaques, one star trophy for the award Grand Champion of the World in the singing division and the trophy for the Grand Champion Performer of the World.

Jed Madela is the first Filipino artist to be inducted into the Hall of Fame of the World Championships of Performing Arts (WCOPA), ranking him alongside renowned actress-singer Liza Minnelli.

World Championships of Performing Arts (WCOPA) is a true International "Olympic" style event with over 55 licensed countries competing for both Junior and Senior Grand Champion of the World of Performing Arts.  Singers, dancers, instrumentalist, actors, models and variety artist travel from around the World to participate in an opening ceremony, continue their education through boot camp training, network with Hollywood Industry professionals, be entertained at the Worldstars Village, as well as compete for the "Gold."

Jed has released 9 albums to date. His debut album, "I’ll Be Around", includes the radio smash "Let Me Love You (From The Bottom of My Heart)". 
His second album, "Songs Rediscovered", was certified double platinum; while his third album "Only Human", went gold. He also released his first Christmas CD, "The Voice Of Christmas" in 2007, which also went gold. He released "Songs Rediscovered 2: The Ultimate OPM Playlist", the perfect follow-up to the Double Platinum-certified "Songs Rediscovered". The new CD is a distinguished collection of timeless OPM songs from the ’80s and ’90s, sung to perfection by a voice that is once heard, never forgotten. "The Classics Album" and "Breathe Again" followed. His album under Star Records is called All Original, a 10 track album of fresh original tracks, one of which was written by Jed himself.

In January 2015, he quietly launched his latest album "Iconic" without notice, making him the first Filipino artist to release an album unannounced. Living up to its album title, "Iconic" features Jed Madela's unique versions of tracks by music icons such as Madonna, Mariah Carey, Celine Dion, and Whitney Houston. He is the only male Filipino artist to release an album featuring the said divas’ hits. He also experiments with new sound and sumptuous beats with EDM-laced tracks such as his remake of Christina Aguilera's pop ballad "Beautiful," “Like A Prayer (Brian Cua Sunset Remix)," “Beautiful (Moophs Remix)," and his original composition "Welcome to My World," which acts as the album's opening and closing tracks served up in two versions. Also included on the 14-track list are Jed's remakes of Barbra Streisand, Gloria Estefan, Tiffany, and Toni Braxton. "Iconic," produced by Jonathan Manalo and Madela himself.

He is currently enjoying sell-out concerts in the Philippines and around the world. He is also a mainstay of ABS CBN's Sunday noontime show ASAP, a mentor on Your Face Sounds Familiar and
a regular judge on Tawag Ng Tanghalan, an amateur singing competition currently aired as a segment of the noontime show It's Showtime.

As a way of giving back, Jed Madela has also spent this time mentoring aspiring artists.

Voice
Madela possesses the vocal range of a countertenor.

Filmography

Television

Film

Concerts
Solo concerts

Discography

 I'll Be Around (2003)
 Songs Rediscovered (2004)
 The Voice of Christmas (2007)
 Only Human (2007)
 Songs Rediscovered 2: The Ultimate OPM Playlist (2009)
 The Classics Album (2010)
 Breathe Again (2011)
 All Original (2013)
 Iconic (2015)
 Superhero (2019)

Awards and recognition

References

External links
 Jed Madela's profile on Star Music
 

Filipino singer-songwriters
21st-century Filipino male singers
Filipino Roman Catholics
Star Magic
1977 births
Living people
People from Iloilo City
Singers from Iloilo
Star Music artists
Universal Records (Philippines) artists
ABS-CBN personalities
Visayan people
Hiligaynon people